Dusky damselfish is a common name for several fishes and may refer to:

Stegastes adustus
Stegastes fuscus